Contract on Cherry Street is a 1977 American made-for-television crime film adaptation of a novel written by Phillip Rosenberg about a New York City police detective, produced by Frank Sinatra's production company Artanis for Columbia Pictures Television and starring Sinatra.

Directed by William A. Graham and produced by Hugh Benson, Renee Valente and Sinatra, Contract on Cherry Street was trumpeted as a major event that garnered positive reviews and strong ratings when it premiered on NBC on November 19, 1977.

The role of Detective Inspector Frank Hovannes was Sinatra's first acting role in seven years. The film was shot on location in New York City and New Jersey over a period of three months. The book on which the film was based was said to be a favorite of Sinatra's mother Dolly, who had been recently killed in an airplane crash near Palm Springs. This was the only television film in which Sinatra played the lead.

Plot

When his partner is gunned down by the mob, Frank Hovannes, a detective inspector with the New York City Police Department, wants to lead his organized-crime unit against those responsible. Legal and departmental restrictions inhibit him, so Hovannes decides to take the matter into his own hands.

A vigilante act, a contract hit against one of the crime syndicate's members, is designed to stir the mob into action so that Hovannes and his men can catch them in the act. He runs into strong objections from his superiors, and trouble from his own team, along the way.

Cast

 Frank Sinatra as Inspector Frank Hovannes
 Martin Balsam as Captain Weinberg
 Martin Gabel as Waldman
 Verna Bloom as Emily Hovannes
 Harry Guardino as Polito
 Marco St. John as Marzano
 Henry Silva as Obregon
 Joe De Santis as Seruto
 Jay Black as Sindardos
 Addison Powell as Halloran
 Michael Nouri as Lou Savage
 Richard Ward as Kittens
 Johnny Barnes as Washington
 Lenny Montana as Phil Lombardi
 Robert Davi as Mickey Sinardos
 Phil Rubenstein as Deli Clark
 Murray Moston as Richie Saint

Critical reception

Sinatra made the cover of TV Guide as press for a special that would air over two consecutive nights on NBC gathered steam. After airing, renowned critic Leonard Maltin would comment: "Sinatra's first TV movie has him well cast as a NYC police officer who takes on organized crime in his own fashion after his partner is gunned down. Aces to this fine thriller." Judith Crist, however, would question why Sinatra was starring in a "mealy-mouthed morality tale", although most reviews were positive.

Contract on Cherry Street was nominated for Best TV Feature/Miniseries at the 1978 Edgar Awards.

References

External links
 

1977 television films
1977 films
1970s crime thriller films
American police detective films
1970s English-language films
NBC network original films
Fictional portrayals of the New York City Police Department
Films about the New York City Police Department
Films scored by Jerry Goldsmith
Films directed by William Graham (director)
Films set in New York City
Films shot in New York City
Films shot in New Jersey
Films with screenplays by Edward Anhalt
1970s American films